Pawaia, also known as Sira, Tudahwe, Yasa, is a Papuan language that forms a tentative independent branch of the Trans–New Guinea family in the classification of Malcolm Ross (2005).

Distribution
Pawaia is spoken in:
Chimbu Province: Karimui District
Eastern Highlands Province: Lufa District and Okapa District, Lamari River
Gulf Province: Baimuru Rural LLG, Purari River near Oroi

Classification
Although Pawaia has reflexes of proto-Trans–New Guinea vocabulary, Ross considers its inclusion questionable on available evidence. Usher classifies it instead with the Teberan languages. Noting insufficient evidence, Pawley and Hammarström (2018) leave it as unclassified rather than as part of Trans-New Guinea.

Pawley and Hammarström (2018) do not consider there to be sufficient evidence for Pawaia to be classified as part of Trans-New Guinea, though they do note the following lexical resemblances between Pawaia and proto-Trans-New Guinea.

emi ‘breast’ < *amu
in ‘tree’ < *inda
su ‘tooth’ < *(s,t)i(s,t)i

Vocabulary
The following basic vocabulary words are from Macdonald (1973) and Trefry (1969), as cited in the Trans-New Guinea database:

{| class="wikitable sortable"
! gloss !! Pawaia
|-
| head || mu
|-
| hair || muse; sị
|-
| ear || nȩᶦ; nɛ̣i
|-
| eye || to; toᵘ
|-
| nose || ho; họ
|-
| tooth || su
|-
| tongue || ha̧pi; hɛmina
|-
| leg || hɛ; si̧ʔi̧
|-
| louse || po; poř
|-
| dog || hạ; hɛ̧
|-
| pig || ya
|-
| bird || deř; ge
|-
| egg || ge džu; yo
|-
| blood || sɛni; su̧
|-
| bone || džɛmɛ; yɛmi
|-
| skin || hɛʔȩ; hɛi
|-
| breast || ɛmi
|-
| tree || i̧; in
|-
| man || džʌʔla; yala
|-
| woman || oi; u
|-
| sun || ol; olsuɛ; sia
|-
| moon || we; wɛ
|-
| water || sa
|-
| fire || sia
|-
| stone || tobu; topu
|-
| road, path || sụ
|-
| name || hɛʔɛpi; hopi
|-
| eat || hatisụɛ; ti haʔayɛ
|-
| one || pɛʔɛmi; pomi
|-
| two || naʔau; nau
|}

Further reading
Trefry, David. 1969. A Comparative Study of Kuman and Pawaian. Canberra: Pacific Linguistics.

References

External links 
 Timothy Usher, New Guinea World, Pawaia

Languages of Papua New Guinea
Teberan–Pawaian languages